is a railway station in Bunkyō, Tokyo, Japan, jointly operated by the Tokyo subway operators Tokyo Metro and Toei Subway. Part of the station originally lay within the Hongō-sanchōme district of Bunkyō Ward when the station was first opened, but following rezoning in 1965, the address of the station became Hongō-nichōme.

Lines 
 Tokyo Metro Marunouchi Line, station number M-21 
 Toei Ōedo Line, station number E-08 
There is no direct connection between the platforms, so transfers require surfacing and re-entering. It is easier to change at Korakuen.

Platforms

Tokyo Metro

Toei

History
 20 January 1954: The Marunouchi Line station opens. 
 1 April 1965: The station address becomes Hongō-nichōme.
 12 December 2000: The Toei Ōedo Line station opens.
 1 April 2004: The station facilities of the Marunouchi Line were inherited by Tokyo Metro after the privatization of the Teito Rapid Transit Authority (TRTA) in 2004.

References

External links

 Tokyo Metro Hongō-sanchōme Station information 
 Toei Hongō-sanchōme Station information 

Railway stations in Tokyo
Tokyo Metro Marunouchi Line
Toei Ōedo Line
Railway stations in Japan opened in 1954